Piteå Municipality is a municipality in Norrbotten County in northern Sweden. Its seat is located in Piteå.

Localities
There are 14 localities (or urban areas) in Piteå Municipality:

The municipal seat in bold

Twin towns – sister cities

Piteå is twinned with:
 Grindavík, Iceland
 Kandalaksha, Russia
 Saint Barthélemy, France

Notable natives
Lina Andersson, cross-country skier
Nicolai Dunger, artist
Nils Edén, politician
Tomas Holmström, ice hockey player
Niklas Jonsson, cross-country skier
Liza Marklund, author
Stefan Persson, ice hockey player
Mikael Renberg, ice hockey player
Daniel Solander, botanist
Mattias Öhlund, ice hockey player

See also
List of islands of the Piteå archipelago
Gråträsk

References

External links

Piteå Municipality – Official site

 
Piteå
Municipalities of Norrbotten County